Freiburger Spielleyt is a Swiss medieval music ensemble based in Freiburg, Germany, founded in 1990. "Spielleyt" is an archaic spelling of Spielleute, the German for medieval players.

The members of the group were drawn from students at the University of Freiburg and the Schola Cantorum Basiliensis. The members have comprised: Marc Lewon (lute, voice), Albrecht Haaf (fiddle), Jutta Haaf (harp, soprano), Murat Coşkun (percussion), Bernd Maier (hurdy-gurdy). and Regina Kabis (soprano) in 2006.

Discography
 Camino de Santiago, 2010 Christophorus
 Weihnacht der Spielleyt - A minstrel Christmas. From the Straßburger Gesangbuch (1697) 2010 Christophorus
 Cum tympano. Music of the Middle Ages with percussion 2008  Christophorus
 Tempus fugit - Music of the Middle Ages 2003 Christophorus
 "Nu wol ûf, ritter, ez ist tac!" Die Tagelieder des von Wissenlo. 2001 Verlag Regionalkultur
 Pilgerwege - the way of the pilgrim. 2000 Verlag der Spielleute
 "Es stot ein lind in himelrich." Christmas music in the Fribourg Minster 1998 Ars Musici
 Ondas do Mar de Vigo - Waves of Vigo 1998 Ars Musici
 "Nun grüß Dich Gott, mein feine Krott" 1997 Ars Musici
 "Die Gedanken sind frei" - Musical Flugblätter from the Peasant's War to the 1848 Revolutions 1997 Ars Musici
 "O Fortuna" - Fortune and misfortune in songs and texts of the Middle Ages 1996 Ars Musici
 Cantigas de Santa Maria Tales of Miracles 1994 Verlag der Spielleute

References

Early music groups